Leuciscus merzbacheri, or the Zhungarian ide,  is a species of cyprinid fish from the Junggar basin in Xinjiang, China.

References 

Leuciscus
Fish described in 1912
Taxa named by Erich Zugmayer